Kentucky Route 234 (KY 234) is a  north–south state highway in southern Kentucky. The southern terminus of the route is at KY 101 six miles (10 km) north of Scottsville. The northern terminus is at U.S. Route 68 (US 68) and KY 80 in downtown Bowling Green.

Although the route follows a generally east–west alignment for most of its length, Kentucky Transportation Cabinet route logs list the route as north–south.

Route description
KY 234 is known solely by its numerical designation from KY 101 to the Allen-Warren county line. Upon entering Warren County, KY 234 becomes Cemetery Road.

A short distance east of the Bowling Green city limits, KY 234 interchanges with Interstate 65 at exit 26. The route continues west into Bowling Green, retaining the Cemetery Road name to an intersection with U.S. Route 31W. West of US 31W, KY 234 becomes Fairview Avenue for a brief stretch to Park Street, where KY 234 splits into a pair of parallel one-way streets. KY 234 northbound follows Sixth Avenue to the northern terminus of the route at US 68/KY 80,while KY 234 southbound utilizes Seventh Avenue between US 68/KY 80 and Park Street.

History
KY 234 originally passed over I-65 with no connection to the expressway. In 2002, the junction of KY 234 and I-65 was altered from an overpass to an interchange in order to provide a direct route from the interstate to downtown Bowling Green. Construction of the new interchange, designated exit 26 on I-65, was completed in late 2002.

Prior to the opening of the new intersection, the Cemetery Road portion of KY 234 between I-65 and US 31W was widened from two to five lanes to accommodate the anticipated increase in traffic flow.

Major intersections

References

External links
Kentucky Route 234 News

0234
0234
0234